Hangar No. 1 is an airship hangar located at Naval Air Engineering Station Lakehurst in Manchester Township, in Ocean County, New Jersey, United States. It was the intended destination of the rigid airship LZ 129 Hindenburg prior to the Hindenburg disaster on May 6, 1937, when it burned while landing.  Built in 1921, it is one of the oldest surviving structures associated with that period's development of lighter-than-air flight.  It was designated a National Historic Landmark in 1968.

Description
In 1921 the US Navy established Lakehurst Naval Air Station to serve as its headquarters for lighter-than-air flight. The new base became the center for experimentation and development of rigid airships for strategic and commercial purposes as well as the control station for all Naval lighter-than-air flights.  Hangar No. 1 was the first major facility built at Lakehurst to house the huge helium-filled dirigibles.

The hangar was completed in 1921 by the Lord Construction Company, with trusses erected by the Bethlehem Steel Company. The hangar is typical of airship hangar designs of World War I, utilizing counterbalanced doors similar to hangars built in Great Britain. At each end are two pairs of massive steel doors mounted on railroad tracks. These double doors are structurally separate from the hangar itself. Each counterbalanced door weighs 1,350 tons and is powered by two 20-horsepower motors, although provisions were made to open the doors manually, which required the assembled manpower of nine men.
Service mezzanines are located on each side of the hangar. The hangar also had a system of railroad tracks that led to the mooring areas outside the hangar. The hangar was large enough to house two rigid airships as well as additional non-rigid airships (blimps).

Operations

The hangar was used to construct the USS Shenandoah (ZR-1) from 1922 to 1923.  On September 4, 1923, the ship made a brief maiden flight in the vicinity of Lakehurst and was christened on October 10, 1923. In 1924 the US Navy obtained its second rigid airship built in Germany and delivered to the United States as a war reparation payment. The  USS Los Angeles (ZR-3)  shared Hangar No. 1 with the USS Shenandoah. The hangar also provided service and storage for other airships including the Graf Zeppelin (LZ 127), USS Macon (ZRS-5), USS Akron (ZRS-4) as well as the German LZ 129 Hindenburg during its transatlantic flights.

Today the hangar holds a mock aircraft carrier flight deck, used as a training facility for aircraft carrier flight deck personnel.

The East Coast Indoor Modelers club, a chartered club within the auspices of the United States' official aeromodeling organization, the Academy of Model Aeronautics, has been allowed to use the hangar since 1926 to fly indoor free flight model aircraft, these self-powered aircraft models benefit from the large wind-free open space of the hangar.

Since 1994, Ocean County Vocational Technical School has operated its Career & Technical Institute in the hangar, the institute offers adult tech programs in aviation and electronic technologies.

In addition to Hangar No. 1 there are five other airship hangars at Lakehurst, which today are used for training, testing and storage.

See also
 Airship hangar
Hangar One (Mountain View, California)
Weeksville Dirigible Hangar
Goodyear Airdock
Bartolomeu de Gusmão Airport
National Register of Historic Places listings in Ocean County, New Jersey
 JB MDL Lakehurst
 Joint Base McGuire-Dix-Lakehurst
 List of airships of the United States Navy
 US Army airships

References

Notes

Citations

Bibliography

  (Public domain)
  

Military installations in New Jersey
Transportation buildings and structures in Ocean County, New Jersey
National Historic Landmarks in New Jersey
United States Naval Air Stations
Aircraft hangars in the United States
National Register of Historic Places in Ocean County, New Jersey
1921 establishments in New Jersey
Aircraft hangars on the National Register of Historic Places
Historic districts on the National Register of Historic Places in New Jersey
Manchester Township, New Jersey